Jenna is an album by Gerald Wilson's Orchestra of the  recorded in 1989 and released on the Discovery label.

Reception

AllMusic rated the album with 4½ stars; in his review, Scott Yanow noted: "This CD is an excellent all-round showcase for both Gerald Wilson's arrangements and his superior big band".

Track listing 
All compositions by Gerald Wilson except where noted.
 "Love for Sale" (Cole Porter) - 4:13
 "Jenna" - 9:46
 "Carlos" - 5:19
 "Back to the Roots" - 5:01
 "The Wailer" - 4:28
 "Blues for Yna Yna" - 6:53
 "B-Bop & the Song" - 5:19
 "Couldn't Love, Couldn't Cry" - 2:34
 "Yarddog Mazurka" - 3:14
 "48 Years Later" - 3:20 	
 "Lunceford Special" (Jimmie Lunceford) - 3:33 	
 "Margie" (Con Conrad, J. Russel Robinson, Benny Davis) - 3:12 	
 "Flying Home" (Lionel Hampton, Benny Goodman, Sid Robin) - 3:23

Personnel 
Gerald Wilson - arranger, conductor
Rick Baptist, Ronald Barrows, Oscar Brashear, Robert Clark, Snooky Young - trumpet
Luis Bonilla, Thurman Green, Charles Loper - trombone
Maurice Spears - bass trombone
Daniel House, Carl Randall, John Stephens, Louis Taylor Jr. - saxophones 
Randall Willis - baritone saxophone, alto saxophone
Michael Cain - piano
Anthony Wilson - guitar 
Stanley Gilbert - bass 
Mel Lee - drums

References 

Gerald Wilson albums
1989 albums
Albums arranged by Gerald Wilson
Albums conducted by Gerald Wilson